The Windward Viaducts are a pair of highway viaducts that pass along the edge of the Ko‘olau Range between the Tetsuo Harano Tunnels and the Hospital Rock Tunnels on the island of O‘ahu in the State of Hawaii.  The viaducts are located on Interstate H-3, which connects Kaneohe with the Interstate H-1 and Interstate H-201 freeways at Hālawa near Pearl Harbor. These structures are among the longest bridges in Hawaii and are considered an engineering marvel.

References

Transportation in Honolulu County, Hawaii
Buildings and structures in Honolulu County, Hawaii
Road bridges in Hawaii
Viaducts in the United States
Bridges on the Interstate Highway System
Bridges completed in 1997